Marcel Matanin (born December 15, 1973 in Vranov nad Topľou) is a long-distance runner from Slovakia, who represented his native country in the men's marathon at the 2004 Summer Olympics in Athens, Greece. There he finished in 81st and last place, clocking a total time of 2:50:26 hours. On April 23, 2006 Matanin won the Leipzig Marathon in 2:19:33 hours.

Achievements
All results regarding marathon, unless stated otherwise

References

1973 births
Living people
Athletes (track and field) at the 2004 Summer Olympics
Olympic athletes of Slovakia
People from Vranov nad Topľou
Sportspeople from the Prešov Region
Slovak male long-distance runners
Slovak male marathon runners
Slovak male cross country runners